Georgia participated at the 2018 Summer Youth Olympics in Buenos Aires, Argentina from 6 October to 18 October 2018.

Medals

Medals awarded to participants of mixed-NOC (combined) teams are represented in italics. These medals are not counted towards the individual NOC medal tally.

Athletics

Basketball

Georgia qualified a boys' team based on the U18 3x3 National Federation Ranking.

 Boys' tournament - 1 team of 4 athletes

Gymnastics

Rhythmic gymnastics
Georgia qualified one rhythmic gymnast based on its performance at the European qualification event.

 Girls' rhythmic individual all-around - 1 quota

Judo

Individual

Team

Modern pentathlon

Shooting

Georgia qualified one sport shooter based on its performance at the 2018 European Championships. 

Team

Taekwondo

Tennis

Weightlifting

Wrestling

Key:
  – Victory by Fall
  – Without any point(s) scored by the opponent
  – With point(s) scored by the opponent
  – With point(s) scored by the opponent

References

2018 in Georgian sport
Nations at the 2018 Summer Youth Olympics
Georgia (country) at the Youth Olympics